Cindy Brunson is a sports anchor and reporter, most known for ESPN's SportsCenter.  She is currently working as part of the Pac-12 Networks broadcast team as a football and men's basketball sideline reporter and women's basketball play-by-play announcer.

Biography
Brunson graduated from Curtis Senior High School in University Place, Washington.  She is an alumna of Washington State University, with a Bachelor of Arts degree in broadcast communications.

Broadcasting career
Brunson joined ESPN as an ESPNEWS anchor in September 1999. She served as co-host alongside David Lloyd on the network's weekend morning SportsCenter programs.  Prior to ESPN, Brunson served as a weekend sports and news anchor/reporter at KATU in Portland, Oregon, from July 1998 to August 1999. While in Portland, she covered the Portland Trail Blazers, the University of Oregon and Oregon State University football, and men's and women's basketball programs.

Prior to KATU, Brunson served as a weather anchor and news reporter at KHQ-6 in Spokane, Washington.

Brunson was anchoring when ESPNEWS covered Florida Marlins rookie Aníbal Sánchez's no-hitter, thrown September 6, 2006. She was also anchoring SportsCenter when San Francisco Giants slugger Barry Bonds hit his 755th and 756th career home runs, tying and surpassing Hank Aaron for most all-time.

Brunson officially left ESPN on December 29, 2012 after co-anchoring her final SportsCenter broadcast alongside Bram Weinstein.  She co-anchored her first SportsCenter broadcast in February 2001 alongside her future husband, Steve Berthiaume.

Brunson joined the Arizona Diamondbacks broadcast team in March 2013.  She cohosted pre-game and post-game shows with Jody Jackson on Sunday games.

Personal life
Brunson is a native of Tacoma, Washington. She is married to current Arizona Diamondbacks play-by-play man and former SNY and ESPN anchor Steve Berthiaume. She is also an avid Seattle Seahawks and Seattle Mariners fan.

References

Cindy Brunson ESPN Bio

American television sports anchors
People from Tacoma, Washington
Washington State University alumni
Women sports announcers
Women's National Basketball Association announcers
College basketball announcers in the United States
College football announcers
Major League Baseball broadcasters
Women's college basketball announcers in the United States
Arizona Diamondbacks announcers
Living people
Year of birth missing (living people)
Place of birth missing (living people)